In algebraic geometry an imaginary curve is an algebraic curve which does not contain any real points.

In some cases, more generally, an algebraic curve with only finitely many real points is considered to be an imaginary curve. For instance, an imaginary line is a line (in a complex projective space) that contains only one real point.

See also
Imaginary point
Real line
Real curve

References

Projective geometry